Genowefa Grabowska (born 1 January 1944, in Przystajń) is a Polish politician and Member of the European Parliament for the Silesian Voivodship with the Social Democracy of Poland, part of the Socialist Group and sits on 
the European Parliament's Committee on Constitutional Affairs.

Grabowska is a substitute for the Committee on the Environment, Public Health and Food Safety.

Education
 1972: Doctor of Law
 1980: assistant professor

Career
 since 1991: professor
 from 1993-1996: head of the Department of International and European Law at the University of Silesia in Katowice, Dean of Faculty
 Author of a number of publications including diplomatic law, environmental law and European law among others
 Senator of the Republic of Poland, Chairman of the Senate Committee on Foreign Affairs and European Integration, Chairman of the Polish delegation to the Western European Union Parliamentary Assembly
 1999-2001: Member of the Legal Advisory Committee to the Minister of Foreign Affairs of the Republic of Poland
 2004: Observer to and then Member of the EP (from 1 May to 19 July
 2002-2003: Representative of the Polish Parliament at the European Convention
 since 2001: Deputy Arbitrator at the Court of Conciliation and Arbitration of the Conference on Security and Cooperation in Europe
 2002: Polish delegate to the Sixth (Legal) Committee of the session of the UN General Assembly
 Member of the International Law Association in London

Decorations
 Silver and Gold Cross of Merit, Officer's Cross of the Order of Poland Reborn, National Education Medal

See also
 2004 European Parliament election in Poland

External links
 
 
 

1944 births
Living people
Members of the Senate of Poland 2001–2005
Social Democracy of Poland MEPs
MEPs for Poland 2004
MEPs for Poland 2004–2009